Count Fredrik Axel von Fersen (5 April 171924 April 1794) was a Swedish statesman and soldier. He served as Lord Marshal of the Riksdag of the Estates, and although he worked closely with King Gustav III before and through the Revolution of 1772, he later opposed the king.

Biography
A son of Lieutenant-General Hans Reinhold von Fersen, he entered the Swedish Life Guards in 1740, and from 1743 to 1748 was in the French service in the Royal-Suedois, where he rose to the rank of brigadier.

In the Seven Years' War Fersen distinguished himself during the operations round Usedom and Wollin in 1759, when he inflicted serious loss on the Prussians. But it is as a politician that he is best known. A member of the Hat party, at the Riksdag of 1755–1756, he was elected Lord Marshal and served three non-consecutive terms in that post before the Revolution of 1772. In 1756 he defeated the projects of the court for increasing the royal power; but, after the disasters of the Seven Years' War, returned to court.

On the accession of the Caps to power in 1766, Fersen refused to employ the Guards to keep order in the capital when King Adolf Frederick of Sweden, driven to desperation by the demands of the Caps, abdicated, and a seven days’ interregnum ensued. At the ensuing Riksdag of 1769, when the Hats returned to power, Fersen was again elected marshal of the diet, but he made no attempt to redeem his pre-election pledges to Crown Prince Gustavus (later Gustav III) that he would carry out a very necessary reform of the constitution, and thus involuntarily contributed to the subsequent establishment of absolutism. When Gustav ascended the throne in 1772, and attempted to reconcile the two factions by a composition which aimed at dividing all political power between them, Fersen said he despaired of quickly bringing the people back to the path of virtue and patriotism, after more than half a century of licence and corruption. Nevertheless, he consented to open negotiations with the Caps, and was the principal Hat representative on the abortive composition committee. During the revolution of August 1772, Fersen remained a passive spectator of the overthrow of the constitution, and was one of the first whom Gustavus summoned to his side after his triumph.

He obstructed the measures of Gustav III, whom he is said to have treated with colossal insolence, for several years. There was a slight collision between them as early as the diet of 1778, but at the diet of 1786, Fersen led the opposition against the king's financial measures, which were consequently rejected. He and twenty of his friends were arrested in 1789, leading to the collapse of the opposition; however, he was quickly released and thereafter remained aloof from politics.

His book Historiska Skrifter is mainly autobiographical, but its historical accounts are often biased.

He was one of the richest men in the realm. He was the lord of four grand houses in Sweden: Löfstad [inherited through his wife], Steninge, Ljung and Mälsåker. He also owned mines, land, forests and iron foundries in Sweden and Finland, and a large share of Sweden's East India Company, the country's most profitable undertaking ever.

Fersen was the father of Axel von Fersen the Younger and Sophie von Fersen, two of his four children with his wife Hedvig Catharina De la Gardie. His other two children were Fabian Reinhold von Fersen and Hedvig Eleonora von Fersen.

Notes

References

External links

Swedish diplomats
1719 births
1794 deaths
Age of Liberty people
Gustavian era people
Field marshals of Sweden
Lord Marshals of the Riksdag of the Estates
Members of the Swedish Academy
Politicians from Stockholm
Swedish nobility
Swedish people of German descent
18th-century diplomats
18th-century Swedish politicians
18th-century Swedish military personnel
Axel Von, Elder